Keith Ferguson is an Australian sport shooter. At the 2012 Summer Olympics he competed in the Men's skeet, finishing in 20th place.

References

Australian male sport shooters
Year of birth missing (living people)
Living people
Olympic shooters of Australia
Shooters at the 2012 Summer Olympics
Shooters at the 2016 Summer Olympics
Shooters at the 2014 Commonwealth Games
Commonwealth Games competitors for Australia
20th-century Australian people
21st-century Australian people